Aproidini is a tribe of tortoise and leaf-mining beetles (Cassidinae) with three recognized species.

It is a monophyletic tribe, found most closely related to Eurispini and Exothispini. The known host plant is Eustrephus latifolius R. Br. Ex Ker-Gawl.

Species
Aproida 
 Aproida cribata Lea 1929
 Aproida balyi Pascoe 1863 
 Aproida monteithi Samuelson 1989

References 

Cassidinae